The 2010 NBA Europe Live Tour was a basketball exhibition tour featuring teams from the NBA and the Euroleague, as a part of the NBA Global Games. The hosting countries were England, France and Spain.

NBA Europe Live combined with the Euroleague American Tour to create a nine-game global preseason schedule.

Teams
The NBA teams who participated in NBA Europe Live were:
 Los Angeles Lakers
 Minnesota Timberwolves (2nd participation) 
 New York Knicks (2nd participation) 

The Euroleague teams who participated were:

 Barcelona
 Olimpia Milano

Games

See also
2010 EuroLeague American Tour

External links
Official NBA Website

NBA Global Games
Europe
2010–11 Euroleague